In mathematics, delay differential equations (DDEs) are a type of differential equation in which the derivative of the unknown function at a certain time is given in terms of the values of the function at previous times.
DDEs are also called time-delay systems,  systems with aftereffect or dead-time, hereditary systems, equations with deviating argument, or differential-difference equations. They belong to the class of systems with the functional state, i.e. partial differential equations (PDEs) which are infinite dimensional, as opposed to ordinary differential equations (ODEs) having a finite dimensional state vector. Four points may give a possible explanation of the popularity of DDEs:

 Aftereffect is an applied problem: it is well known that, together with the increasing expectations of dynamic performances, engineers need their models to behave more like the real process. Many processes include aftereffect phenomena in their inner dynamics. In addition, actuators, sensors, and communication networks that are now involved in feedback control loops introduce such delays. Finally, besides actual delays, time lags are frequently used to simplify very high order models. Then, the interest for DDEs keeps on growing in all scientific areas and, especially, in control engineering.
 Delay systems are still resistant to many classical controllers: one could think that the simplest approach would consist in replacing them by some finite-dimensional approximations. Unfortunately, ignoring effects which are adequately represented by DDEs is not a general alternative: in the best situation (constant and known delays), it leads to the same degree of complexity in the control design. In worst cases (time-varying delays, for instance), it is potentially disastrous in terms of stability and oscillations.
 Voluntary introduction of delays can benefit the control system.
 In spite of their complexity, DDEs often appear as simple infinite-dimensional models in the very complex area of partial differential equations (PDEs).

where  represents the trajectory of the solution in the past.

Examples
 Continuous delay 
 Discrete delay  for 
 Linear with discrete delays  where .
 Pantograph equation  where a, b and λ are constants and 0 < λ < 1. This equation and some more general forms are named after the pantographs on trains.

Solving DDEs
DDEs are mostly solved in a stepwise fashion with a principle called the method of steps. For instance, consider the DDE with a single delay

with given initial condition .

This can be continued for the successive intervals by using the solution to the previous interval as inhomogeneous term. In practice, the initial value problem is often solved numerically.

Example
Then the initial value problem can be solved with integration,

Similarly, for the interval
 we integrate and fit the initial condition,

i.e.,

Reduction to ODE 
In some cases, differential equations can be represented in a format that looks like delay differential equations. 
 Example 1 Consider an equation  Introduce  to get a system of ODEs 
 Example 2 An equation  is equivalent to  where

The characteristic equation

Similar to ODEs, many properties of linear DDEs can be characterized and analyzed using the characteristic equation.
The characteristic equation associated with the linear DDE with discrete delays

is

The roots λ of the characteristic equation are called characteristic roots or eigenvalues and the solution set is often referred to as the spectrum. Because of the exponential in the characteristic equation, the DDE has, unlike the ODE case, an infinite number of eigenvalues, making a spectral analysis more involved. The spectrum does however have some properties which can be exploited in the analysis. For instance, even though there are an infinite number of eigenvalues, there are only a finite number of eigenvalues to the right of any vertical line in the complex plane.

This characteristic equation is a nonlinear eigenproblem and there are many methods to compute the spectrum numerically. In some special situations it is possible to solve the characteristic equation explicitly. Consider, for example, the following DDE:

The characteristic equation is

There are an infinite number of solutions to this equation for complex λ. They are given by

where Wk is the kth branch of the Lambert W function.

Applications 

 Dynamics of diabetes
 Epidemiology
 Population dynamics
Classical electrodynamics

See also
 Functional differential equation
 Halanay Inequality

References

Further reading

External links
 

Control theory
Differential equations